Aleksandar Smiljanić (born 8 March 1976) is a Serbian basketball executive and former professional player.

Playing career
During his professional career, Smiljanić played for numerous clubs in Serbia and abroad in Europe.

National team career
Smiljanić was a member of the FR Yugoslavian university team that won the gold medal at the 2001 Summer Universiade in Beijing, China. Smiljanić was on the preliminary squad as the thirteenth player for the 2002 FIBA World Championship. Despite not making the final cut, Smiljanić received a gold medal instead of Vladimir Radmanović who was ostracized from the team due to indiscipline during the tournament.

Post-playing career
Smiljanić worked as a scout of the Fast Break basketball agency from 2010 to 2012. Later, he was named as a technical secretary of Dynamic Belgrade.

Smiljanić was the team manager of the Serbia men's U19 team at the 2021 FIBA Under-19 Basketball World Cup in Latvia.

Career achievements
 Serbia-Montenegro League champion: 1 (with Partizan Pivara MB: 2005–06)
 Russian Super League (2nd-tier) champion: 1 (with Avtodor Saratov: 2008–09)
 Yugoslav Cup winner: 1 (with FMP Železnik: 1997)

References

External links
 Aleksandar Smiljanić at Euroleague.net
 Aleksandar Smiljanić at Eurobasket.com

1976 births
Living people
Sportspeople from Sremska Mitrovica
Basketball League of Serbia players
BC Avtodor Saratov players
BC Politekhnika-Halychyna players
KK BFC players
KK Mega Basket players
KK Partizan players
KK Budućnost players
KK FMP (1991–2011) players
KK Srem players
KK Železničar Inđija players
Maroussi B.C. players
PBC Lokomotiv-Kuban players
FIBA World Championship-winning players
Serbian basketball scouts
Serbian basketball executives and administrators
Serbian expatriate basketball people in Cyprus
Serbian expatriate basketball people in Greece
Serbian expatriate basketball people in Montenegro
Serbian expatriate basketball people in Russia
Serbian expatriate basketball people in Slovenia
Serbian expatriate basketball people in Ukraine
Serbian men's basketball players
Shooting guards
Universiade medalists in basketball
Universiade gold medalists for Serbia and Montenegro
Medalists at the 2001 Summer Universiade